= Ghera-sumargad =

Village in Maharashtra

- Village
- Interactive map of Ghera-sumargad
- Country: India
- State: Maharashtra

Ghera-sumargad is a small village in Ratnagiri district, Maharashtra state in Western India. The 2011 Census of India recorded a total of 48 residents in the village. Ghera-sumargad's geographical area is approximately 775 hectares (1,920 acres).
